Itzkoff is a surname. Notable people with the surname include:

Dave Itzkoff (born 1976), American journalist
Seymour Itzkoff (born 1928), American psychologist and writer